Bikmetovo (Bikmät) is a rural locality (a selo) in Tatar-Ulkanovsky Selsoviet, Tuymazinsky District, Bashkortostan, Russia. The population was 109 as of 2010. There are 4 streets.

Geography 
Bikmetovo is located 24 km east of Tuymazy (the district's administrative centre) by road. Maloye Bikmetovo is the nearest rural locality.

References 

Rural localities in Tuymazinsky District